The 1996 Big South Conference men's basketball tournament took place February 29–March 2, 1996, at the Vines Center in Lynchburg, Virginia, the home of the Liberty Flames. For the first time in their school history, the UNC Greensboro Spartans won the tournament, led by head coach Randy Peele.

Format
All eight teams participated in the tournament, hosted at the Vines Center. Teams were seeded by conference winning percentage.

Bracket

* Asterisk indicates overtime game
Source

All-Tournament Team
Scott Hartzel, UNC Greensboro
Eric Cuthrell, UNC Greensboro
Jeremy Davis, UNC Greensboro
Peter Aluma, Liberty
Marcus White, Liberty

References

Tournament
Big South Conference men's basketball tournament
Big South Conference men's basketball tournament
Big South Conference men's basketball tournament
Big South Conference men's basketball tournament